Alfred Walker (October 23, 1901 – May 19, 1983) was an American fencer. He competed in the team foil event at the 1924 Summer Olympics.

References

External links
 

1901 births
1983 deaths
American male foil fencers
Olympic fencers of the United States
Fencers at the 1924 Summer Olympics
Sportspeople from Brooklyn
Sportspeople from Fairfield, Connecticut